Gaylor may refer to:

People
Surname
Alan B. Gaylor, American businessman
Amber Gaylor, English footballer
Anne Nicol Gaylor, American atheist feminist and founder of the Freedom From Religion Foundation
Annie Laurie Gaylor, American editor, author, and co-president of the Freedom From Religion Foundation
Brett Gaylor, Canadian filmmaker
Chris Gaylor, drummer for The All-American Rejects
Robert Gaylor, United States Air Force Chief Master Sergeant
Trevor Gaylor, retired American football wide receiver

Given name
Gaylor Curier, French basketball player
Gaylor Kasle, American bridge player

Places
Gaylor, Missouri
Gaylor Peak, a summit in Yosemite National Park